Bertil Eng (24 January 1930 – 14 January 2006) was a Swedish speed skater. He competed in two events at the 1956 Winter Olympics.

References

1930 births
2006 deaths
Swedish male speed skaters
Olympic speed skaters of Sweden
Speed skaters at the 1956 Winter Olympics
Sportspeople from Stockholm